Jadzień  is a village in the administrative district of Gmina Kiernozia, within Łowicz County, Łódź Voivodeship, in central Poland. In 2011, its population was 91 people.

References

Villages in Łowicz County